Incilius luetkenii (formerly Bufo luetkenii, common name yellow toad) is a species of toad in the family Bufonidae. It is found in the Mesoamerica along the Pacific versant from central Costa Rica to extreme southern Chiapas, Mexico (including the intervening Guatemala, El Salvador, Honduras, and Nicaragua), as well as dry interior valleys of Guatemala and Honduras and San Juan River drainage in Costa Rica on the Atlantic versant. It occurs in open areas, including disturbed pasturelands in lowland dry forest, and to a lesser extent, in lowland moist and premontane moist forests. It breeds in temporary pools. It is a common species that is not facing major threats.

References

luetkenii
Amphibians of Costa Rica
Amphibians of El Salvador
Amphibians of Guatemala
Amphibians of Honduras
Amphibians of Mexico
Amphibians of Nicaragua
Amphibians described in 1891
Taxonomy articles created by Polbot